Thimminenipalem is a village in the Chintakani mandal of Khammam district in the state of Telangana, India. It is located on the banks of the Munneru river.

Villages in Khammam district